Muhammad Naeem, is a Pakistani nuclear scientist who was the chairman of the Pakistan Atomic Energy Commission (PAEC). He is also the current chairman of the Board of Governors of Pakistan Institute of Engineering and Applied Sciences (PIEAS).

References

External links 
 Pakistan Atomic Energy Commission (PAEC) Website
 Pakistan Institute of Engineering and Applied Sciences (PIEAS) Website

Living people
Pakistani nuclear physicists
Academic staff of Pakistan Institute of Engineering and Applied Sciences
21st-century Pakistani scientists
20th-century Pakistani scientists
1949 births
Chairpersons of the Pakistan Atomic Energy Commission